Amit Varma is a writer and podcaster based in Mumbai.

In 2008, his first novel My friend, Sancho was nominated to the longlist for the Man Asian Literary Prize 2008. In April 2009, he was named by BusinessWeek magazine in its India's 50 Most Powerful People 2009 list, for his blog India Uncut.

Career 
Amit Varma has worked in advertising, television and journalism, and has written for publications like The Guardian, The Wall Street Journal and Wisden Cricketers' Almanack. He was a Managing Editor of Cricinfo India. The editor of Pragati, an online magazine, Amit Varma also hosts a podcast, The Seen and the Unseen, on public policy, economics and behavioural science.

Awards 
In October 2007, Varma won the 2007 Bastiat Prize for Journalism, which aims to honor writers "whose work cleverly and wittily promotes the institutions of the free society". He won the prize again in 2015.
 Bastiat Prize (2007, 2015)

See also
 List of Indian writers

References

External links 

 Official Website
 India Uncut
 The Seen and the Unseen

Writers from Mumbai
Indian male journalists
Indian bloggers
Indian sportswriters
Indian columnists
Living people
Indian classical liberals
English-language writers from India
Bastiat Prize winners
Male bloggers
Year of birth missing (living people)